Lion Jagapathi Rao is a 1991 Indian Kannada-language drama film, directed by Om Sai Prakash and written by Sainath Thotapalli, starring Vishnuvardhan in dual roles, along with Lakshmi and Bhavya. The film was produced by Sri Vinayaka Combines.

The film was critically acclaimed upon release and won laurels at the Karnataka State Film Awards. The lead actor Vishnuvardhan was adjudged the Best Actor for the year 1991. Vishnuvardhan himself was one of the screenplay writers for the movie.

Cast
 Vishnuvardhan as Lion Jagapathi Rao and Inspector Kumar
 Lakshmi as Janaki
 Bhavya
 Mukhyamantri Chandru as Parvathayya
 Aravind
 Sadashiva Saliyan as Harihara Prasad
 Rajanand
 Ramamurthy
 Umesh
 Mysore Lokesh as Anthony 
 Shanthamma

Soundtrack
The music of the film was composed by Upendra Kumar and the lyrics were written by R. N. Jayagopal.

References

External source

 Lion Jagapathi Rao Songs

1991 films
1990s Kannada-language films
Indian action films
Films directed by Sai Prakash
1991 action films